SummerSlam is a professional wrestling pay-per-view (PPV) and livestreaming event, produced annually since 1988 by WWE, the world's largest professional wrestling promotion. Dubbed "The Biggest Party of the Summer", it is considered WWE's second biggest event of the year behind their flagship event, WrestleMania. It is also considered one of the company's five biggest events of the year, along with WrestleMania, Royal Rumble, Survivor Series, and Money in the Bank, referred to as the "Big Five". In addition to PPV since 1988, the event has aired on the WWE Network since 2014 and Peacock since 2021.

The inaugural SummerSlam took place on August 29, 1988, at Madison Square Garden in New York City. From 2009 to 2014, SummerSlam was held at the Staples Center in Los Angeles and from 2015 to 2018, the event took place at the Barclays Center in the New York City borough of Brooklyn. From its inception up through the 2021 event, SummerSlam was held annually in August. The 2022 SummerSlam marked the first and thus far only time that the event was not held in August, as it was instead held in July, with the event returning to August in 2023.

During the COVID-19 pandemic in 2020, that year's SummerSlam was WWE's first PPV produced from their bio-secure bubble, the WWE ThunderDome. After the promotion resumed live touring with fans in July 2021, that year's SummerSlam was promoted as the "biggest event of 2021" due to WrestleMania 37 having to be held at a reduced venue capacity. In turn, the 2021 SummerSlam became the highest-grossing SummerSlam event of all time.

History

In the late 1980s, the World Wrestling Federation's (WWF, now WWE) main competition in the professional wrestling industry was from the National Wrestling Alliance's (NWA) Jim Crockett Promotions. WWF Chairman Vince McMahon countered Jim Crockett's successful Starrcade pay-per-view (PPV), which began airing in 1983, by creating WrestleMania in 1985. After WrestleMania III in March 1987, the most successful professional wrestling pay-per-view event in history, McMahon created Survivor Series, which aired the same day as Starrcade in November 1987. After defeating Crockett in the ratings war, McMahon created the Royal Rumble, an event airing for free on the USA Network in January 1988, on the same night as the Crockett produced PPV Bunkhouse Stampede. The event set a ratings record for the network with eight million households tuning in to watch the event. In retaliation, Crockett created the Clash of the Champions I event, which aired simultaneously with WrestleMania IV. WrestleMania IV garnered higher ratings, and not long after, Crockett filed for bankruptcy and sold his company to Ted Turner, who rebranded it as World Championship Wrestling (WCW).

As the WWF continued to replace its closed circuit programming with pay-per-view programming, McMahon added more pay-per-views to the lineup to capitalize on the success of his previous events. In addition to WrestleMania in March/April, Survivor Series in November, and Royal Rumble in January, McMahon created an event for August, which he named SummerSlam. The inaugural SummerSlam was scheduled to be held on August 29, 1988, at Madison Square Garden in New York City, New York. To keep the WWF from having a pay-per-view market monopoly, Turner began airing monthly WCW pay-per-views. As a result, both companies brought in hundreds of millions of dollars of revenue.

Dubbed "The Biggest Party of the Summer",  SummerSlam became one of the promotion's most successful events, eventually considered the second biggest event of the year, behind WrestleMania, and also one of the "Big Four" pay-per-views, along with WrestleMania, Survivor Series, and Royal Rumble, the promotion's original four annual events and their four biggest events of the year. From 1993 to 2002, it was considered one of the "Big Five", including King of the Ring, but that PPV event was discontinued after 2002. In August 2021, Money in the Bank became recognized as one of the "Big Five".

In May 2002, the WWF was renamed to World Wrestling Entertainment (WWE) following a lawsuit with the World Wildlife Fund over the "WWF" initialism. In April 2011, the promotion ceased using its full name with the "WWE" abbreviation becoming an orphaned initialism. Also in March 2002, the promotion introduced the brand extension, in which the roster was divided between the Raw and SmackDown brands where wrestlers were exclusively assigned to perform—ECW became a third brand in 2006. The first brand extension was dissolved in August 2011, but it was reintroduced in July 2016. SummerSlam, along with the other original "Big Four" events, were the only PPVs to never be held exclusively for one brand during either brand split periods. In 2014, SummerSlam began to air on WWE's online streaming service, the WWE Network, which launched in February that year, and in 2021, the event became available on Peacock as the American version of the WWE Network merged under Peacock in March that year.

As a result of the COVID-19 pandemic in early 2020, WWE had to present the majority of its programming for Raw and SmackDown from a behind closed doors set at the WWE Performance Center in Orlando, Florida beginning mid-March. The 2020 SummerSlam was scheduled for August 23 at the TD Garden in Boston, Massachusetts, but it and the preceding night's NXT TakeOver event had to be relocated due to the pandemic. On August 17, WWE announced that SummerSlam would emanate from Orlando's Amway Center and it would be produced by way of a bio-secure bubble dubbed the WWE ThunderDome, which was first utilized for the August 21 episode of SmackDown. This made SummerSlam the first major WWE event to be held outside of the Performance Center since March 2020, as well as their first pay-per-view produced from the ThunderDome. Inside the ThunderDome, drones, lasers, pyro, smoke, and projections were utilized to enhance wrestlers' entrances, and nearly 1,000 LED boards were installed to allow for rows and rows of virtual fans, who could register for a free virtual seat. Arena audio was also mixed with that of the virtual fans.

While SummerSlam has been considered WWE's second biggest event of the year for many years, in 2021, it was promoted as the promotion's biggest event of that year. WrestleMania 37 in April 2021, which was the promotion's first event with live fans since before the pandemic, had to be held at a reduced venue capacity due to the ongoing pandemic. In July 2021, WWE resumed live touring with fans, and in an effort to sell out that year's SummerSlam, which was held at the Allegiant Stadium in the Las Vegas suburb of Paradise, Nevada, WWE promoted SummerSlam as the "biggest event of 2021". The 2021 event in turn became the highest-grossing SummerSlam event of all time.

From its inception in 1988 up through the 2021 event, SummerSlam had been held annually in August. The 2022 event, however, was the first SummerSlam to not be held in August, as it was instead held in July. It took place on Saturday, July 30, 2022, at the Nissan Stadium in Nashville, Tennessee. The 2023 event was scheduled for Saturday, August 5, 2023, at Ford Field in Detroit, Michigan, thus returning SummerSlam to the month of August.

Events

Notes

References

External links